Jeremy Lott (born October 1, 1978) is an American writer, editor, and pundit. He briefly worked at the news website Rare. Previously, Lott was the editor of 
Real Clear Religion and associate editor of Real Clear Science. Lott has written several books and articles, with his work appearing in well over 100 publications, including the National Post, Australian Financial Review, the Financial Times, the Guardian, Politico, and The American Prospect.

Lott has previously worked at the Cato Institute, Capital Research Center, American Spectator, and the Competitive Enterprise Institute. From 2006–2007 he was the Warren T. Brookes Journalism Fellow at CEI. Although much of Lott's past employment has been associated with conservative and libertarian organizations, he publishes frequently in left-leaning The Guardian.

Lott holds a B.A. from Trinity Western University in religious studies and lives bicoastal between Lynden, Washington and Fairfax, Virginia.

Publications
 Lott, Jeremy (2006). In Defense of Hypocrisy: Picking Sides in the War on Virtue Thomas Nelson. 
 Lott, Jeremy (2008). The Warm Bucket Brigade: The Story of the American Vice Presidency Thomas Nelson. .  A light-hearted history of the vice-presidency, "an altogether amusing, digressive account"
 Mandel, Marvin; Lott, Jeremy (2010). I'll Never Forget It: Memoirs of a Political Accident from East Baltimore The Maryland Public Policy Institute. 
 Lott, Jeremy (2010). William F. Buckley (Christian Encounters Series)Thomas Nelson.

References 

Living people
1978 births
Trinity Western University alumni
21st-century American writers
Competitive Enterprise Institute